The 2016–17 Ekstraklasa (currently named Lotto Ekstraklasa due to sponsorship reasons) was the 83rd season of the Ekstraklasa, the top Polish professional league for association football clubs, since its establishment in 1927. The league is operated by the Ekstraklasa SA.

The season started on 15 July 2016, running to 4 June 2017. After the 20th matchday the league was on winter break between 20 December 2016 and 9 February 2017. The regular season was played in a round-robin tournament. A total of 16 teams participated, 14 of which competed in the league during the 2015–16 season, while the remaining two were promoted from the I liga. The fixtures were announced on 1 June 2016.

Each team played a total of 30 matches, half at home and half away. After 30th round (at the end of April 2017), league was split into two groups: championship round (top eight teams) and relegation round (bottom eight teams). Each team was play 7 more games (1-4 and 9-12 teams will play four times at home), starting with half the points achieved during the first phase of 30 matches. So, finally each team played a total of 37 matches. This is the fourth season to take place since the new playoff/playout rule has been introduced.

The defending champions were Legia Warsaw, who won their 11th Polish title the previous season.

Teams
Sixteen teams competed in the league – the top fourteen teams from the previous season, as well as two teams promoted from the I liga. Arka Gdynia became the first team to be promoted. They return to the league after a five-season absence. Wisła Płock returns to the top level nine years after their relegation. Termalica Bruk-Bet Nieciecza changed its name to Bruk-Bet Termalica Nieciecza.

Stadiums
Note: Table lists in alphabetical order.

Personnel and kits

Managerial changes

Regular season

League table

Positions by round

Results

Play-offs

Championship round

League table

Positions by round

Results

Relegation round

League table

Positions by round

Results

Season statistics

Top goalscorers

Top assists

Attendances

Awards

Annual awards

See also
2016–17 I liga

References

External links
  
Ekstraklasa at uefa.com

2016-17
Pol
1